Ignatovo is a rural locality (a village) in Kemskoye Rural Settlement, Vytegorsky District, Vologda Oblast, Russia. The population was 19 as of 2002.

Geography 
Ignatovo is located 92 km southeast of Vytegra (the district's administrative centre) by road. Artyunino is the nearest rural locality.

References 

Rural localities in Vytegorsky District